Kameran "Kamie" Crawford (born October 25, 1992) is an American television host, and beauty pageant winner who was crowned Miss Teen USA 2010 on July 24, 2010 at the Atlantis Paradise Island Resort in the Bahamas. Crawford has been praised for her emotional intelligence and compassion on the popular TV Show, Catfish.

Career

Pageantry 
Crawford won the Miss Maryland Teen USA 2010 title on November 1, 2009, competing in her first pageant. Crawford spent 5 months training for the Miss Maryland Teen USA pageant and decided to enter after a talk with her friend. "I decided to enter the Miss Maryland Teen USA pageant after a friend, who had competed two years before me, encouraged me to take part. She thought I would be successful and have fun. After winning the state pageant, the winner represents the state at the national competition, Miss Teen USA," she said. She also won the Miss Photogenic award. She had been trained by LauRen Merola, Miss Pennsylvania USA 2008.

On July 24, 2010, Crawford represented Maryland in the Miss Teen USA 2010 pageant where she made history by being the first contestant from Maryland to win the title. Crawford was the fourth African American to win the title of Miss Teen USA after Janel Bishop in 1991, Ashley Coleman in 1999, and Marissa Whitley in 2001 as well as the third Hispanic to win the title after Charlotte Lopez in 1993 and Hilary Cruz in 2007.

Television hosting 

Throughout 2019, she served as part of a panel of rotating hosts for the second part of season 7 of the television series Catfish, along with singer Elle King, basketball player Nick Young, actress Kimiko Glenn, model Slick Woods and football player Justin Combs, after Max Joseph's departure from the series. In 2020, she became the permanent co-host of the MTV series. She also hosted the reunion episode of Issa Rae’s reality show Sweet Life: Los Angeles. She is currently hosting the ninth season of Are You The One? which began airing on Paramount Plus in January 2023.

Personal life
Crawford is the daughter of Victor and Carla Crawford and is the oldest of five girls, Victoria, Karynton, and twins, Kenadi and Kendal. She is of a diverse background, which includes Jamaican, German, English, Cuban, Indian, and African-American ancestry. She is also fluent in three languages, including Spanish and Patois.

Crawford graduated from Winston Churchill High School in Potomac, Maryland in 2010 where she was captain of the varsity cheerleading team. Prior to winning Miss Teen USA, she was selected into the medical program for the Congressional Student Leadership Conference at Georgetown University. In September 2010, Crawford enrolled in classes at the New York Film Academy while taking some core classes at a local college. She graduated from Fordham University in 2015 with a degree in communications and media and began a career in television and hosting. Crawford signed with JAG Models in 2013.

References

External links
 Miss Maryland Teen USA website
 Miss Teen USA website

1992 births
American people of Jamaican descent
American people of German descent
American people of Irish descent
American people of Cuban descent
American actresses of Indian descent
Miss Teen USA winners
Plus-size models
People from Potomac, Maryland
New York Film Academy alumni
Living people
Female models from Maryland
Fordham University alumni
African-American beauty pageant winners
21st-century American women